John Patrick Mutton (9 March 1915 – 20 June 2006) was an Australian politician.

He was born in Fawkner, the son of Charlie Mutton and Annie Maria Peachey. He attended the local state school and became a panel beater, joining both the Labor Party and the Vehicle Builders' Union in 1934. On 17 January 1938 he married Eileen Fitzpatrick, with whom he had two sons. From 1940 he was a member of the Sheet Metal Workers' Union, and he owned and ran a panel-beating business. From 1954 to 1970 he served on Broadmeadows City Council, with two terms as mayor from 1957 to 1958 and from 1966 to 1967. In 1966 he left the Labor Party, and the following year he was elected to the Victorian Legislative Assembly as the independent member for Coburg. He generally supported Labor in the Assembly, and he was defeated in 1979. Mutton died in 2006 in Epping.

References

1915 births
2006 deaths
Independent members of the Parliament of Victoria
Members of the Victorian Legislative Assembly
20th-century Australian politicians